Bratislava I is a district in the city of Bratislava. It is identical with its sole borough, Bratislava's Old Town. With an area of 10 square kilometers, it is the smallest district of Slovakia. It is completely surrounded by other Bratislava districts: Bratislava II, Bratislava III, Bratislava IV and Bratislava V.

Location 
For administrative purposes, according to VZN No. 6/2001, the Old Town of Bratislava has total area of 124 meters squared. Old Town's western boundary is the eastern wall of the original Botanical Garden of the Comenius University area, today running partly though a parking lot underneath the Lafranconi Bridge, the boundary then crosses the tram lines of the Nábr. arm. gen. L. Svobodu Street and continues through the eastern side of the Mlynská dolina Street until the State Geological Institute of Dionýz Štúr on Patrónka where the boundary crosses to the other side of the street, continuing to the junction of Lamačská cesta – Cesta na Červený most, then it crosses the railway line Malacky - Bratislava near Bratislava Železná studienka railway station where it sharply turns towards south-east.

Old Town's northern boundary is the northern side of the Malacky - Bratislava railway line, it continues through the eastern part of Opavská Street, it crosses the Limbová Street at the place of the underpass underneath the railway tracks, continues through the northern side of the railway line and the southern side of Opavská Street. At the crossing of Opavská Street and Ďurgalova Street it bends northwards and continues through the northern side of the Pražská Street, it crosses the Stromová Street and again continues through the northern side of the Malacky - Bratislava railway line. The boundary then continues around the northern edge of the Bratislava main railway station and at the crossing of Jaskov Rad Street and Pod Strážami Street it turns to the southeast. It continues through the western side of the underpass underneath the railway tracks and then it turns to the northeast and continues through the northern side of the Dobšinského Street until its crossing with Smrečianska Street.

References

Sources 
 Všeobecne záväzné nariadenie hlavného mesta Slovenskej republiky Bratislavy č. 6/2001 zo 7. júna 2001 ktorým sa podrobne vymedzujú územia mestských častí hlavného mesta Slovenskej republiky Bratislavy (in Slovak)

Districts of Slovakia
Boroughs of Bratislava
Geography of Bratislava Region